Seizure: European Journal of Epilepsy is a peer-reviewed medical journal covering epilepsy established in 1992. The editor-in-chief is Markus Reuber (University of Sheffield). It is the official journal of Epilepsy Action. It is published ten times a year by Elsevier.

Abstracting and indexing
The journal is abstracted and indexed in:
Academic OneFile
CINAHL
Current Contents/Clinical Medicine
Embase
E-psyche
Index Medicus/MEDLINE/PubMed
Neuroscience Citation Index
PsycINFO
Psychology Abstracts
Research Alert
Science Citation Index
Scopus

According to the Journal Citation Reports, the journal has a 2013 impact factor of 2.059, ranking it 105th out of 194 journals in the category "Clinical Neurology" and 177th out of 252 journals in the category "Neurosciences".

References

External links

Epilepsy Action

Epilepsy journals
Publications established in 1992
Elsevier academic journals